Baghuapal railway station is a railway station on the East Coast Railway network in the state of Odisha, India. It serves Baghuapal village. Its code is BGPL. It has one platforms. Passenger, MEMU, Express trains halt at Baghuapal railway station.

Major trains

 Puri–Barbil Express

See also
 Jajpur district

References

Railway stations in Jajpur district
Khurda Road railway division